Mohammad Pouya Nozhati (born June 8, 1985) is an Iranian footballer who currently plays for Sepidrood in the Persian Gulf Pro League.

Early years
He is originally from Lashtenesha.

Club career
Nozhati has played for Malavan.

Club career statistics
Last Update  15 May 2015 

 Assist Goals

References

1985 births
Living people
Malavan players
Naft Tehran F.C. players
Fajr Sepasi players
Saipa F.C. players
Sepidrood Rasht players
Iranian footballers
Shahrdari Ardabil players
Association football forwards
People from Rasht
Sportspeople from Gilan province